Brian Leonard Reynolds (10 June 1932 – 7 February 2015) was a professional cricketer who spent his entire career at Northamptonshire.

Biography
Reynolds was born 10 June 1932, Kettering, Northamptonshire.

As with Dennis Brookes, it is impossible to evaluate Brian Reynolds' contribution to Northamptonshire solely in terms of his performances for the first team. They are impressive enough, but all the runs and catches, and the twenty stumpings as stand-in wicket-keeper, must be supplemented with thirteen seasons' work as Chief Coach in charge of the Second XI, and a further eleven years in the specially-created role of Cricket Development Officer. In John Arlott's words: "In his own mind he is not only a cricketer, he is a Northamptonshire cricketer." It is quite impossible to imagine the ever-loyal Reynolds following his agent's advice and moving to another county for a smarter car or a fatter wage packet; for that matter, it is equally impossible to imagine him employing an agent in the first place.

He joined the Northamptonshire staff in 1950 and made his championship debut that summer, no qualification period was necessary for a Kettering boy, born and bred, against Sussex at Northampton. After national service, he returned to the County Ground and broke through in 1956 by passing 1,000 runs for the first time to earn his county cap. Reynolds missed the entire 1959 season thanks to a football injury (he appeared for both Kettering Town and Peterborough United, later qualifying as a referee) but was hardly ever absent from the Northamptonshire side between 1960 and 1968, when he ceased to be automatic choice.

Forming a reliable opening partnership with Michael Norman, Reynolds topped 1,500 runs in five consecutive summers. His best return was 1,843 in 1962, closely followed by 1,809 the year after. He also remained one of the fittest members of the staff, and his running between the wickets was being compared favourably with that of some of his younger colleagues as he moved into his mid-thirties. There was, in short, no more dedicated professional on the circuit.

It would have been his crowning glory of his benefit year, 1965, had Northamptonshire managed to win the Championship title. That they failed narrowly to do so was due to in part to Worcestershire's victory over Hampshire at Bournemouth in a match of three declarations in late August. This caused, as Wisden admitted, "a great deal of controversy", and is still a talking point in the members' bar at Wantage Road to this day. Reynolds, the senior pro, had been playing golf with skipper Keith Andrew when the news came through of Colin Ingleby-Mackenzie's closure 146 runs behind; soon afterwards, Hampshire had been skittled for 31 to hand Don Kenyon's men the points. The ultimate disappointment of '65 notwithstanding, the triumvirate of Andrew, vice-captain Roger Prideaux and Reynolds still guided the club through some of the most successful seasons in its history.

The committee's decision to release him at the end of 1970 was less popular around the county than their appointment of him as coach three years later. Ken Turner knew his man: "I want you to get these lads" (in the second XI) "so tired during the day that they won't have any energy left to go out at night!" Those who were serious about wanting first-team cricket, like David Capel and Rob Bailey, got on with it and duly achieved their goal.

Later, as one of the first CDO's in the country, he spread the cricketing gospel into Northamptonshire schools and developed the Centre of Excellence scheme which has produced a number of talented youngsters. He also travelled many miles each summer on scouting missions, never without a deckchair, binoculars, flask of tea and copy of The Daily Telegraph. When Brian Reynolds officially retired in 1997, chairman Lynn Wilson said in that year's Annual Report: "Throughout the long history of the County Cricket Club there have been few, if any, individuals more committed and dedicated to Northamptonshire's cause."

He died in 2015 at the age of 82.

References

External links

1932 births
2015 deaths
English cricketers
Northamptonshire cricketers
Sportspeople from Kettering
Players cricketers
A. E. R. Gilligan's XI cricketers